Frost is a Canadian short drama film, directed by Jeremy Ball and released in 2012. The film stars Emily Piggford as Naya, a young Inuit girl in the Canadian Arctic who makes a perilous discovery while hunting.

Made while Ball was a student at the Canadian Film Centre, the film was shot entirely on a soundstage, with chroma key editing and special effects processing used to create the landscape. The film premiered at the 2012 Toronto International Film Festival.

The film was a Canadian Screen Award nominee for Best Live Action Short Drama at the 1st Canadian Screen Awards.

References

External links
 

Films about Inuit in Canada
2012 short films
2012 films
Canadian Film Centre films
2010s English-language films
Canadian drama short films
2010s Canadian films